This is a list of notable Iraqi Americans, including both original immigrants who obtained American citizenship and their American descendants.

Academia/Science
 Elias Alsabti, plagiarist medical researcher and Pennsylvania medical licensed  
 Sinan Antoon, academic, writer, filmmaker
 Hind Rassam Culhane, professor
 Rafil A. Dhafir, physician
 Mona Hanna-Attisha, pediatrician, professor, Flint Water Crisis whistleblower and public health advocate
 Khidir Hamza, scientist and fraudulent
 Emanuel Kamber, Ph. D. is  A Physics professor at Western Michigan University
 Majid Khadduri, academic and founder of the Paul H. Nitze School of Advanced International Studies Middle East Studies program
 Thomas L. Saaty, Assyrian-Iraqi University Professor at the University of Pittsburgh
 Nada Shabout, art historian and Assistant Professor at the University of North Texas
 Ella Shohat, professor, author and activist
 Saadi Simawe, translator, novelist and teacher
 Donny George Youkhanna,  Iraqi  archaeologist, anthropologist, author, curator, and scholar, and a visiting professor at Stony Brook University in New York, internationally known as "the man who saved the Iraqi National Museum."

Activists
 Faisal Saeed Al Mutar, human rights activist and social entrepreneur
 Amir Ashour, LGBT Rights activist

Actors
 David Chokachi, actor of Turkmen and Finnish descent
 Yasmine Hanani, actress known for her role in Voices of Iraq and The Kingdom
 Nicholas Kadi, actor
 Chris Kattan, comedian and actor; best known for his work on Saturday Night Live; paternal grandfather was of Iraqi Jewish descent
 Vincent Oshana, Assyrian-Iraqi actor
 Heather Raffo, award-winning playwright/actress most known for her role in 9 Parts of Desire
 Basam Ridha, actor
 Alia Shawkat, actress known as Maeby Fünke on Arrested Development, father is from Iraq

Architecture
 Hisham N. Ashkouri, architect

Artists
 M. J. Alhabeeb, calligrapher
 Sama Raena Alshaibi, artist
 Halla Ayla, artist
 Wafaa Bilal, artist and professor at the School of the Art Institute of Chicago
 Hayv Kahraman, artist/painter
 Toba Khedoori, artist

Business
Huda Kattan, CEO of Huda Beauty
 Shakir al Khafaji, businessman

Comedians
 Brian Awadis, also known as FaZe Rug
 Remy Munasifi, also known as GoRemy

Directors
 Usama Alshaibi, filmmaker
 Carole Basri, filmmaker
 Ali Hossaini, filmmaker, philosopher and pacifist
 Anisa Mehdi, Emmy Award-winning film director and journalist
 Alfred Rasho, Iraqi Assyrian documentary filmmaker

Military
 Ahmed K. Altaie, Specialist in the United States Army, killed in Iraq

Models
 Amy Fadhli, fitness model, actress and winner of the Fitness America National Champion 1996

Musicians
 Hanan Alattar, soprano opera singer
 Rahim AlHaj, musician and composer
 Ahmed El Faleh, singer who participated in Super Star 3, the pan-Arabic version of Pop Idol
 Amir ElSaffar, musician and younger brother of Dena
 Sargon Gabriel, Assyrian singer
 Linda George, Assyrian singer
 Juliana Jendo, Assyrian singer
 Chemda Khalili, singer-songwriter and co-host of the Keith and The Girl podcast
 Stephan Said, musician, writer and political activist
 Ashur Bet Sargis, Assyrian singer
 Janan Sawa, Assyrian musician
 TIMZ, rapper

Politics
 Rend al-Rahim Francke, politician, political activist and once held the position as Iraqi ambassador to the United States
 Ayham al-Samarie, politician
 Adam Benjamin, Jr., Assyrian-Iraqi, Indiana Congressman
 Anna Eshoo, Assyrian-Iraqi, California Congressman
 John Nimrod, Assyrian-Iraqi, Illinois Senator
 Qubad Talabani, Kurdistan Regional Government (KRG) representative in Washington DC and son of Iraqi president Jalal Talabani

Sports
 Alex Agase, Assyrian-American, top level American football (Gridiron) player
 Lou Agase, Assyrian-American, top level American football (Gridiron) player
 Najah Ali, boxer
 Steven Beitashour, Assyrian currently plays for San Jose Earthquakes in Major League Soccer.
 Falah Hassan, footballer
 Justin Meram, Chaldean U.S. based soccer player
 Michael Shabaz, Assyrian American tennis player

Writers and journalists
 Lorraine Ali, reporter, editor, culture writer and music critic for Newsweek
 Ibrahim al-Marashi, academic plagiarized by the British government
 Alise Alousi, Iraqi-American poet
 Sinan Antoon, poet, novelist and translator
 Leila Barclay, American journalist and storyteller
 Alon Ben-Meir, professor, writer and is the Middle East Project director at the World Policy Institute
 Sargon Boulus, Assyrian-Iraqi
 Abdul Ameer Yousef Habeeb, journalist
 Jack Marshall (author), poet and author
 Dunya Mikhail, poet
Ali Nuri, poet
 Armand Nassery, author and filmmaker
 Greg Patent, author (born in Hong Kong to a Russian father and Iraqi mother)
 Daniel Pearl, journalist (kidnapped and murdered in Pakistan)
 Ayad Rahim, journalist
 Mahmoud Saeed, Iraqi novelist was born in Mosul in 1939. Wrote more than twenty novels and story collections, and hundreds of articles. He started writing short stories at an early age.
 Zainab Salbi, writer, activist, co-founder and president of Women for Women International
 Cindy Sargon, Assyrian-Iraqi TV chef
Anita Sarkeesian, Canadian-American feminist media critic and public speaker. She is the founder of Feminist Frequency, a website that hosts videos and commentary analyzing portrayals of women in popular culture. Her parents are Armenians from Iraq who emigrated to Canada in the 1970s
 Rachel Wahba, writer
 Thura Al Windawi, author
 Obelit Yadgar, Assyrian-Iraqi-Radio Glendale, Wisconsin
 Weam Namou,  Iraqi-American, author

Other
 Husham Al-Husainy, Sheikh of the Karbalaa Islamic Education Center
 Noor Almaleki, honor killing victim
 Hassan Al-Qazwini, religious leader
 Mohammed Odeh al-Rehaief, attorney who helped the United States armed forces rescue Jessica Lynch from Iraq
 Ahmed Qusai al-Taayie, soldier
 Aban Elias, civil engineer, (held hostage and has not been heard from)
 Samir Gegea, Iraqi interpreter who captured Saddam Hussein
 Jumana Hanna, involved in war propaganda
 Farris Hassan
 Michael Mizrachi, professional poker player (Iraqi Jewish father)
 Robert Mizrachi, professional poker player and older brother of Michael Mizrachi
 Mohammad Munaf, terrorist
 Samuel Nalo, businessman, hijacker, burglar, and brother of Robert
 Nadya Suleman, gave birth to octuplets in January 2008
 Abdul Rahman Yasin, suspected American terrorist

See also
List of Iraqis

References

 
American
Iraqi
Iraqi